Nicola Tanda (Sorso, 22 December 1928 – London, 4 June 2016) was an Italian philologist and literary critic.
He studied under Ungaretti and Sapegno at Rome. He was
for over thirty years professor at the University of Sassari, first specialising in Italian literature,
and then later in Sardinian philology and Sardinian literature. 
He was a leading advocate for minority languages and their literary expression in the island of Sardinia, including the Sardinian language and Algherese Catalan.
As such he was an honorary member of ANPOSDI.
He wrote the new Philology of Italians based on the European Charter for Regional or Minority Languages.
He was founder and President of the Sardinian
PEN Club. 
He was President of the jury of the Premio Ozieri literary
prize founded in 1956 to promote new works composed in Sardinian tongues.
He founded in 2003 the Centre for Study of Sardinian Philology.
As an editor/director he has guided the publication of over 100 volumes written in Sardinian languages.

He was an expert of the literary theory of 19th-century Italian authors as well as
an authoritative voice on many modern and contemporary Italian writers including
Pratolini, 
Montale, 
Gramsci, 
Dessì, 
Deledda, 
Pirandello,
Pandolfo Collenuccio,
Monti,
Sebastiano Satta, 
Salvatore Farina,
Antonino Mura Ena, and 
Salvatore Satta.
In 1965 he co-edited with Dessì Narratori di Sardegna the first compilation of Sardinian writers.

He was a member of the International Association for the Study of Italian Language and Literature.
He was an external associate of the International Centre For Multilingualism.

Bibliography 
 with G. Dessì, Narratori di Sardegna, Milan, Mursia, 1965
 with Joyce Lussu, Fronti e frontiere, Milan, Mursia, 1969
 Realta' e memoria nella narrativa contemporanea, Rome, Bulzoni, 1970
 Contemporanei: proposte di lettura, Turin, Loescher, 1972
 Classicismo e illuminismo nell'opera del Monti, Sassari, Dessì, 1974
 Pandolfo Collenuccio: il dramma della saviezza, Rome, Bulzoni, 1988
 Letteratura e lingue in Sardegna, Sassari, EDES, 1991
 Dal mito dell'isola all'isola del mito: Deledda e dintorni, Rome, Bulzoni, 1992
 with G.Dessì, Eleonora d'Arborea: racconto drammatico in quattro atti, Sassari, EDES, 1995
 Un' odissea de rimas nobas: verso la letteratura degli italiani, Cagliari, CUEC, 2003
 Quale Sardegna?: pagine di vita letteraria e civile, Sassari, Delfino, 2007
 Hispanic Intertextuality in Contemporary Sardinian Poetry in AnnalSS 6, 2009. Lost in Translation. Testi e culture allo specchio, Text in English in pdf

Notes 

1928 births
2016 deaths
Italian philologists
People from Sorso
Italian literary critics
Italian male non-fiction writers
Linguists from Italy